Dario de Urra Torriente (born July 19, 1939) is a retired Cuban ambassador.

Career 
From  to  he was Third Secretary and Attache Commercial in Algeria.
From  to  he was 1st Secretary then Chargé d'affaires in Brazzaville (People's Republic of the Congo).
From  to  he was Director of Africa and Middle East Department at the Ministry of Foreign Affairs (Cuba).
From  to  he was Vice-Consul in Kingston (Jamaica).
From  to  he was Adviser at the Embassy in Conakry (Guinea).
From  to  he was Head of Middle East and North Africa Department at the Ministry of Foreign Affairs (Cuba).
From  to  he was Ambassador in Brazzaville (People's Republic of the Congo).
From  to  he was Vice-president of the Directorate "Afrique Noire".
In  he was Ambassador in Victoria, Seychelles Seychelles Republic.
From  to  he was Ambassador in Kingston (Jamaica).
From  to  he was Vice-president of the Directorate "Afrique Noire".
In  he was Ambassador in Guinea.
From  to  he was Ambassador in Tehran (Iran).
In  he was Responsible of Middle East and North Africa Departmrnt.
From  to  he was Ambassador in Beirut (Lebanon).

References 

1939 births
Living people
Ambassadors of Cuba to the Republic of the Congo
Ambassadors of Cuba to Lebanon
Ambassadors of Cuba to Iran
Ambassadors of Cuba to Guinea
Ambassadors of Cuba to Jamaica
Ambassadors of Cuba to Seychelles